Alarm is a 1941 German crime film directed by Herbert B. Fredersdorf and starring Karl Martell, Maria von Tasnady and Paul Klinger.

The production was made by the independent Aco-Film rather than one of Germany's major film companies. It was shot at the Althoff Studios and various locations around Berlin including Tempelhof Airport and the Karstadt Department Store. The film's sets were designed by the art director Bruno Lutz.

Cast
 Karl Martell as Kriminalkommissar Petersen
 Maria von Tasnady as Sekretärin Vera Kaufmann
 Paul Klinger as Herbert Flügger
 Rolf Weih as Werkpilot Werner Blennemann
 Hilde Sessak as Platzanweiserin Helene Hoesch
 Hilde Hildebrand as Pensionsinhaberin Frau Anders
 Lotte Rausch as Dienstmädchen Meta
 Theodor Loos as Rentner Ophagen
 Fritz Rasp as Feinmechaniker Stülken
 Alexander Engel as Barpianist Ölkers
 Gerhard Bienert as Kriminalkommissar Dr. Dittmann
 Albert Venohr as Kriminaloberassistent Schneider
 Rudolf Platte as Ganove Schielauge
 Eduard Bornträger as Kneipenwirt
 Peter Elsholtz as Warenhausdetektiv
 Erwin Klietsch as Kriminalassistent
 Alfred Maack as Dr. Kugler
 Paul Rehkopf as Ganove Gustav
 Volker Soetbeer as Ganove Willy
 Wolfgang Dohnberg as Ganove
 Robert Vincenti-Lieffertz as Ganove
 F.W. Schröder-Schrom as Kinodirektor
 Rudolf Schündler as Produzent des Werbefilms
 Ewald Wenck as Buchhalter
 Reinhold Bernt as Wirt im Lokal
 Fritz Draeger as Fotograf der Mordkommission

References

Bibliography

External links 
 

1941 films
Films of Nazi Germany
German crime films
1941 crime films
1940s German-language films
German black-and-white films
Films directed by Herbert B. Fredersdorf
Films based on German novels
Films based on crime novels
Films shot at Althoff Studios
1940s German films